PASOK leadership election may refer to:

 2007 PASOK leadership election
 2012 PASOK leadership election

See also
 2017 Greek centre-left leadership election

PASOK